The 1999 World Judo Championships were the 21st edition of the World Judo Championships, and were held in Birmingham, Great Britain in 1999.

Medal overview

Men

Women

Medal table

Results overview

Men

60 kg

66 kg

73 kg

81 kg

90 kg

100 kg

+100 kg

Open class

Women

48 kg

52 kg

57 kg

63 kg

70 kg

78 kg

+78 kg

Open class

External links
 
 Competition Results - 1999 World Judo Championships (International Judo Federation)

World Championships
World Judo Championships
International sports competitions in Birmingham, West Midlands
Judo competitions in the United Kingdom
World Judo Championships